St Ninian's Isle is a small tied island connected by the largest tombolo in the UK to the south-western coast of the Mainland, Shetland, in Scotland. It is part of the civil parish of Dunrossness on the South Mainland. The tombolo, known locally as an ayre from the Old Norse for "gravel bank", is 500 metres long. During the summer the tombolo is above sea level and accessible to walkers. During winter, stronger wave action removes sand from the beach so that it is usually covered at high tide, and occasionally throughout the tidal cycle, until the sand is returned the following spring. Depending on the definition used, St. Ninian's is thus either an island, or a peninsula; it has an area of about 72 hectares.

The nearest settlement is Bigton, also in the parish of Dunrossness.  The important early medieval St Ninian's Isle Treasure of metalwork, mostly in silver, was discovered under the church floor in 1958. Many seabirds, including puffins, visit the island, with several species nesting there.

History
As its name suggests, the island has ecclesiastical connections, which may like others in the Northern Isles, Hebrides and Faroes have connections to the Culdees or papar. However, the island's history is far older than Christianity, and Neolithic graves have been found within the walls of the chapel (formerly beneath the floor).

The ruins of a 12th-century chapel can still be seen near the end of the tombolo. The dedication is to Shetland's patron saint, the enigmatic Saint Ninian of Galloway, who is also widely venerated on the nearby Orkney Islands, and may be commemorated in the name of North Ronaldsay. In 1958, an excavation found a hoard of 8th century silver in the chapel grounds under a stone slab in a wooden box, which caused a renewed archaeological interest in the island. It was suspected to have been buried to hide it from, or stolen in, a Viking raid. The remains of a pre-Norse chapel were also found, which may indicate some kind of Culdee presence.

The last family to live on the island, that of Henry Leask, left the island in 1796. Henry Leask was married twice and had 13 children.

St Ninian's Isle Treasure

The St Ninian's Isle Treasure was discovered under a cross-marked slab in the floor of the early St. Ninian's church, on 4 July 1958 by a local schoolboy, Douglas Coutts. Coutts was helping visiting archaeologists led by Professor A. C. O'Dell of Aberdeen University at a dig on the isle. The silver bowls, jewellery and other pieces, not all of which were probably new when deposited, are believed to date from c.750–825 AD.

See also

 List of islands of Scotland

Notes

References
 O'Dell, A. St. Ninian's Isle Treasure. a Silver Hoard Discovered on St. Ninian's Isle, Zetland on 4th July, 1958. Aberdeen University Studies. No. 141
 Nicolson, James R. (1972) Shetland. Newton Abbott. David & Charles.
 Youngs, Susan (ed), "The Work of Angels", Masterpieces of Celtic Metalwork, 6th–9th centuries AD, pp. 108–112, 1989, British Museum Press, London, 
 Webster, Leslie, Anglo-Saxon Art, 2012, British Museum Press,

External links

 Photographs of the St Ninian's Isle Treasure, at the National Museums Scotland website
 Shetland Museum - Pictures of the treasure
 St Ninian's Isle - Shetland Heritage
 St Ninian's Isle Treasure on Shetlopedia

Archaeological sites in Shetland
Tourist attractions in Shetland
Uninhabited islands of Shetland
Former populated places in Scotland
Tied islands
Tombolos